Skyrack was a wapentake of the West Riding of Yorkshire, England. It was split into upper and lower divisions and centred in Headingley, Leeds.  The Lower Division included the parishes of Aberford,  Bardsey, Barwick-in-Elmet, Kippax, Thorner, Whitkirk and part of Harewood, while the Upper Division included the parishes of Adel, Bingley, Guiseley and parts of Harewood, Ilkley and Otley.

The Upper division of Skyrack was bounded to the north by the River Wharfe whilst the southern edge was bounded by the River Aire. Both divisions together contained 82 settlements.

The Skyrack wapentake derives its name from a large oak that grew for centuries in Headingley. It is believed that the word "skyrack" comes from the Old English phrase scir ac meaning "Shire Oak", under which meetings were held. The tree finally collapsed in 1941. There is a plaque to commemorate it on the outside of the garden wall of the Original Oak pub. It also gives its name to the Skyrack pub opposite the Original Oak. The pub, which is one of the stopping points on the Otley Run pub crawl, is a grade II listed building.

References

External links
Full list of 82 settlements in the wapentake of Skyrack

History of Bradford
History of Leeds
Wapentakes of the West Riding of Yorkshire